Chiwen is a Chinese dragon, and in Chinese mythology is one of the 9 sons of the dragon. He is depicted in imperial roof decorations and other ornamental motifs in traditional Chinese architecture and art.

Chiwen is alternatively written , using the homophonous character .

Each one of the nine dragons has a protective function. The Nine dragons are also used in many place names in Hong Kong, such as Kowloon, literally meaning "nine dragons" in Cantonese, as well as numerous lakes, rivers and hamlets in mainland China.

According to the Ming Dynasty  "The ch'i-wen, which like swallowing, are placed on both ends of the ridgepoles of roofs (to swallow all evil influences)." 

Welch describes chiwen as "the dragon who likes 'to swallow things'".
This is the fish-like, hornless dragon with a very truncated body and large, wide mouth usually found along roof ridges (as if swallowing the roof beams). His presence on roofs is also said to guard against fires. A paragraph in the Tang dynasty book Su Shi Yan Yi by Su E says that a mythical sea creature called the chi wen  was put on the roofs of buildings during the Han dynasty to protect the structures from fire hazards. This dragon is still found on the roofs of traditional Chinese homes today, protecting the inhabitants from fires. 
In Fengshui theory, a chiwen or chiwei supposedly protects against not only fires, but also floods and typhoons.

The Japanese language borrowed these names for architectural roof decorations as Sino-Japanese vocabulary. Shibi  "ornamental roof-ridge tile" is more commonly used than chifun  or shifun . In Japanese mythology, the Shachihoko  (a mythical fish with a carp's arched tail, tiger's head, and dragon's scales) roof decoration is believed to cause rain and protect against fire. This  is a kokuji "Chinese character invented in Japan" that can also be read shachi for "orca".

References

See also
Gargoyle
Grotesque (architecture)
Onigawara
Shachihoko

External links
The Nine Dragon Scroll, The Circle of the Dragon
Architecture in China
Chinese architectural history
Chinese culture
Chinese dragons
Chinese words and phrases
Traditional East Asian Architecture